Izurium Capital was a UK-based investment firm focused on private equity and special situations investment strategies. Izurium Capital was founded in December 2009 and is headquartered in London, United Kingdom. Since the inception, the firm has raised over €300 million in committed capital. The firm seeks to invest in a variety of businesses with operations in Europe, the Americas, and Asia. The firm prefers businesses with a sizeable international presence outside their home market. The firm prefers to invest in companies with enterprise values ranging from €50 million to €500 million. The firm specializes in control investments, co-investments, leveraged buyouts, growth equity investments and sponsored mergers and acquisitions. The firm also provides mezzanine capital as part of its special situations strategy.

History
Izurium Capital was founded in 2009. The founders of the firm came from private equity firms and hedge funds including Francisco Partners and Sisu Capital.

Investments
Izurium Capital invested in or purchased companies such as Dynacast, CapitalSpring, Emailvision, Fab.com, South American Silver Corp.

References

External links
Official website
Profile on Bloomberg Businessweek

Private equity firms of the United Kingdom
Defunct companies based in London